Tomasz Borkowski (born 30 November 1972) is a Polish footballing coach who previously played for and was manager of Lechia Gdańsk. He is the current manager of AP Orlen Gdańsk.

Senior career

The majority of Borkowski's career was spent with Lechia Gdańsk, playing in total 258 games and scoring 10 goals in all competitions during his 3 spells with the club (including his time with Lechia-Polonia Gdańsk). During his playing career he also had two brief stints with Bałtyk Gdynia, where he played for a season, and Unia Tczew where he only played for six months.

Coaching career

Since his retirement Borkowski has gone into coaching, with his first management spell in 2006 with Lechia Gdańsk. He spent one season as the Lechia first team manager,. before he joined the Lechia second team as their manager in 2008. After spending time at various youth levels with Lechia, he left as a coach of the club in 2011, joining the newly established AP Orlen Gdańsk, which focused on the development of youth players in its academy. Borkowski earned his UEFA Pro Licence in 2014. In 2016 Borkowski became the manager of the AP Orlen Gdańsk women's team, leading the team from the third division to the Ekstraliga, Poland's top division of women's football, in 2020.

Honours

Player

Lechia Gdańsk
III liga (gr. II): 2004–05
IV liga (Pomerania): 2003–04
Liga okręgowa (Gdańsk II): 2002–03

Manager

AP Orlen Gdańsk
I liga (northern gr.): 2019–20
II liga (Wielkopolska): 2016–17

References

1972 births
Polish footballers
Polish football managers
Sportspeople from Gdańsk
Sportspeople from Pomeranian Voivodeship
Lechia Gdańsk players
Unia Tczew players
Lechia Gdańsk managers
Association football defenders
Living people